Chao may refer to:

People
 Chao (surname), various Chinese surnames (including 晁 and 巢, as well as non-Pinyin spellings)
 Zhou (surname) (周), may also be spelled Chao
 Zhao (surname) (趙/赵), may also be spelled Chao in Taiwan and Hong Kong

Places
 Chao, Virú, Peru
 Chao District
 Chao Valley
 Cerro Chao, or Chao volcano, a lava flow in Chile
 Chao Lake, in Hefei, Anhui Province, China
 Chao (state), a minor state of the Chinese Bronze Age
 Ilhéu Chão, in the Madeira archipelago

Other uses
 Chao (currency) (鈔), the banknote used in Mongol Yuan Dynasty in China
 Chao (Sonic the Hedgehog), a fictional species
 Chao method, a way of indicating Chinese tones devised by Yuen Ren Chao
 Chǎo technique (炒), a Chinese stir frying technique
 Chao, part of several Thai royal ranks and titles
 Chao (monarchy), a title of the Lan Na royal family members
 Cháo, the Vietnamese version of congee

See also

 Cao (disambiguation)
 Chaos (disambiguation)
Charo (disambiguation)
 Chau (disambiguation) 
 Choa (disambiguation) 
 Chow (disambiguation)
 Zhao (disambiguation)
 Ciao (disambiguation)
 Chao Phraya River, Thailand
 Sacred Chao, a symbol of Discordianism